Waste management or waste disposal includes the processes and actions required to manage waste from its inception to its final disposal.
This includes the collection, transport, treatment and disposal of waste, together with monitoring and regulation of the waste management process and waste-related laws, technologies, economic mechanisms.

Waste can be solid, liquid, or gases and each type has different methods of disposal and management. Waste management deals with all types of waste, including industrial, biological, household, municipal, organic, biomedical, radioactive wastes. In some cases, waste can pose a threat to human health. Health issues are associated throughout the entire process of waste management. Health issues can also arise indirectly or directly: directly through the handling of solid waste, and indirectly through the consumption of water, soil and food. Waste is produced by human activity, for example, the extraction and processing of raw materials. Waste management is intended to reduce adverse effects of waste on human health, the environment, planetary resources and aesthetics.

The aim of waste management is to reduce the dangerous effects of such waste on the environment and human health. A big part of waste management deals with municipal solid waste, which is created by industrial, commercial, and household activity.

Waste management practices are not uniform among countries (developed and developing nations); regions (urban and rural areas), and residential and industrial sectors can all take different approaches.

Proper management of waste is important for building sustainable and liveable cities, but it remains a challenge for many developing countries and cities. A report found that effective waste management is relatively expensive, usually comprising 20%–50% of municipal budgets. Operating this essential municipal service requires integrated systems that are efficient, sustainable, and socially supported. A large portion of waste management practices deal with municipal solid waste (MSW) which is the bulk of the waste that is created by household, industrial, and commercial activity. According to the Intergovernmental Panel on Climate Change (IPCC), municipal solid waste is expected to reach approximately 3.4 Gt by 2050; however, policies and lawmaking can reduce the amount of waste produced in different areas and cities of the world. Measures of waste management include measures for integrated techno-economic mechanisms of a circular economy, effective disposal facilities, export and import control and optimal sustainable design of products that are produced.

In the first systematic review of the scientific evidence around global waste, its management and its impact on human health and life, authors concluded that about a fourth of all the municipal solid terrestrial waste is not collected and an additional fourth is mismanaged after collection, often being burned in open and uncontrolled fires – or close to one billion tons per year when combined. They also found that broad priority areas each lack a "high-quality research base", partly due to the absence of "substantial research funding", which motivated scientists often require. Electronic waste (ewaste) includes discarded computer monitors, motherboards, mobile phones and chargers, compact discs (CDs), headphones, television sets, air conditioners and refrigerators. According to the Global E-waste Monitor 2017, India generates ~ 2 million tonnes (Mte) of e-waste annually and ranks fifth among the e-waste producing countries, after the United States, the People’s Republic of China, Japan and Germany.

Principles of waste management

Waste hierarchy
The waste hierarchy refers to the "3 Rs" Reduce, Reuse and Recycle, which classifies waste management strategies according to their desirability in terms of waste minimisation. The waste hierarchy is the bedrock of most waste minimization strategies. The aim of the waste hierarchy is to extract the maximum practical benefits from products and to generate the minimum amount of end waste; see: resource recovery. The waste hierarchy is represented as a pyramid because the basic premise is that policies should promote measures to prevent the generation of waste. The next step or preferred action is to seek alternative uses for the waste that has been generated, i.e., by re-use. The next is recycling which includes composting. Following this step is material recovery and waste-to-energy. The final action is disposal, in landfills or through incineration without energy recovery. This last step is the final resort for waste which has not been prevented, diverted or recovered. The waste hierarchy represents the progression of a product or material through the sequential stages of the pyramid of waste management. The hierarchy represents the latter parts of the life-cycle for each product.

Life-cycle of a product

The life-cycle begins with the design, then proceeds through manufacture, distribution, and primary use and then follows through the waste hierarchy's stages of reduce, reuse and recycle. Each stage in the life-cycle offers opportunities for policy intervention: to rethink the need for the product, to redesign to minimize waste potential, and to extend its use. Product life-cycle analysis is a way to optimize the use of the world's limited resources by avoiding the unnecessary generation of waste.

Resource efficiency

Resource efficiency reflects the understanding that global economic growth and development can not be sustained at current production and consumption patterns. Globally, humanity extracts more resources to produce goods than the planet can replenish. Resource efficiency is the reduction of the environmental impact from the production and consumption of these goods, from final raw material extraction to the last use and disposal.

Polluter-pays principle
The polluter-pays principle mandates that the polluting party pays for the impact on the environment. With respect to waste management, this generally refers to the requirement for a waste generator to pay for appropriate disposal of the unrecoverable material.

History

Throughout most of history, the amount of waste generated by humans was insignificant due to low levels of population density and exploitation of natural resources. Common waste produced during pre-modern times was mainly ashes and human biodegradable waste, and these were released back into the ground locally, with minimum environmental impact. Tools made out of wood or metal were generally reused or passed down through the generations.

However, some civilizations have been more profligate in their waste output than others. In particular, the Maya of Central America had a fixed monthly ritual, in which the people of the village would gather together and burn their rubbish in large dumps.

Modern era

Following the onset of industrialisation and the sustained urban growth of large population centres in England, the buildup of waste in the cities caused a rapid deterioration in levels of sanitation and the general quality of urban life. The streets became choked with filth due to the lack of waste clearance regulations. Calls for the establishment of a municipal authority with waste removal powers occurred as early as 1751, when Corbyn Morris in London proposed that "... as the preservation of the health of the people is of great importance, it is proposed that the cleaning of this city, should be put under one uniform public management, and all the filth be...conveyed by the Thames to proper distance in the country".

However, it was not until the mid-19th century, spurred by increasingly devastating cholera outbreaks and the emergence of a public health debate that the first legislation on the issue emerged. Highly influential in this new focus was the report The Sanitary Condition of the Labouring Population in 1842 of the social reformer, Edwin Chadwick, in which he argued for the importance of adequate waste removal and management facilities to improve the health and wellbeing of the city's population.

In the UK, the Nuisance Removal and Disease Prevention Act of 1846 began what was to be a steadily evolving process of the provision of regulated waste management in London. The Metropolitan Board of Works was the first citywide authority that centralized sanitation regulation for the rapidly expanding city, and the Public Health Act 1875 made it compulsory for every household to deposit their weekly waste in "moveable receptacles" for disposal—the first concept for a dustbin. In the Ashanti Empire by the 19th century, there existed a Public Works Department that was responsible for sanitation in Kumasi and its suburbs. They kept the streets clean daily and commanded civilians to keep their compounds clean and weeded.

The dramatic increase in waste for disposal led to the creation of the first incineration plants, or, as they were then called, "destructors". In 1874, the first incinerator was built in Nottingham by Manlove, Alliott & Co. Ltd. to the design of Alfred Fryer. However, these were met with opposition on account of the large amounts of ash they produced and which wafted over the neighbouring areas.

Similar municipal systems of waste disposal sprung up at the turn of the 20th century in other large cities of Europe and North America. In 1895, New York City became the first U.S. city with public-sector garbage management.

Early garbage removal trucks were simply open bodied dump trucks pulled by a team of horses. They became motorized in the early part of the 20th century and the first closed body trucks to eliminate odours with a dumping lever mechanism were introduced in the 1920s in Britain. These were soon equipped with 'hopper mechanisms' where the scooper was loaded at floor level and then hoisted mechanically to deposit the waste in the truck. The Garwood Load Packer was the first truck in 1938, to incorporate a hydraulic compactor.

Waste handling and transport

Waste collection methods vary widely among different countries and regions. Domestic waste collection services are often provided by local government authorities, or by private companies for industrial and commercial waste. Some areas, especially those in less developed countries, do not have formal waste-collection systems.

Waste handling practices
Curbside collection is the most common method of disposal in most European countries, Canada, New Zealand, United States, and many other parts of the developed world in which waste is collected at regular intervals by specialised trucks. This is often associated with curb-side waste segregation. In rural areas, waste may need to be taken to a transfer station. Waste collected is then transported to an appropriate disposal facility. 
In some areas, vacuum collection is used in which waste is transported from the home or commercial premises by vacuum along small bore tubes. Systems are in use in Europe and North America.

In some jurisdictions unsegregated waste is collected at the curb-side or from waste transfer stations and then sorted into recyclables and unusable waste. Such systems are capable of sorting large volumes of solid waste, salvaging recyclables, and turning the rest into bio-gas and soil conditioner. 
In San Francisco, the local government established its Mandatory Recycling and Composting Ordinance in support of its goal of "Zero waste by 2020", requiring everyone in the city to keep recyclables and compostables out of the landfill. The three streams are collected with the curbside "Fantastic 3" bin system – blue for recyclables, green for compostables, and black for landfill-bound materials – provided to residents and businesses and serviced by San Francisco's sole refuse hauler, Recology. The city's "Pay-As-You-Throw" system charges customers by the volume of landfill-bound materials, which provides a financial incentive to separate recyclables and compostables from other discards. The city's Department of the Environment's Zero Waste Program has led the city to achieve 80% diversion, the highest diversion rate in North America. Other businesses such as Waste Industries use a variety of colors to distinguish between trash and recycling cans. In addition, in some areas of the world the disposal of municipal solid waste can cause environmental strain due to official not having benchmarks that help measure the environmental sustainability of certain practices.

Waste segregation

This is the separation of wet waste and dry waste. The purpose is to recycle dry waste easily and to use wet waste as compost. When segregating waste, the amount of waste that gets landfilled reduces considerably, resulting in lower levels of air and water pollution. Importantly, waste segregation should be based on the type of waste and the most appropriate treatment and disposal. This also makes it easier to apply different processes to the waste, like composting, recycling and incineration. It is important to practice waste management and segregation as a community. One way to practice waste management is to ensure there is awareness. The process of waste segregation should be explained to the community.

Segregated waste is also often cheaper to dispose of because it does not require as much manual sorting as mixed waste. There are a number of important reasons why waste segregation is important such as legal obligations, cost savings and protection of human health and the environment. Institutions should make it as easy as possible for their staff to correctly segregate their waste. This can include labelling, making sure there are enough accessible bins and clearly indicating why segregation is so important. Labeling is especially important when dealing with nuclear waste due to how much harm to human health the excess products of the nuclear cycle can cause.

Financial models
In most developed countries, domestic waste disposal is funded from a national or local tax which may be related to income, or property values. Commercial and industrial waste disposal is typically charged for as a commercial service, often as an integrated charge which includes disposal costs. This practice may encourage disposal contractors to opt for the cheapest disposal option such as landfill rather than the environmentally best solution such as re-use and recycling.

Financing of solid waste management projects can be overwhelming for the city government, especially if the government see it as an important service they should render to the citizen. Donors and grants are a funding mechanism that is dependent on the interest of the donor organization. as much as it is a good way to develop a city's waste management infrastructure, attracting and utilizing grants is solely reliant on what the donor considers as important. Therefore, it may be a challenge for a city government to dictate how the funds should be distributed among the various aspect of waste management.

In some areas like Taipei, the city government charges its households and industries for the volume of rubbish they produce. Waste is collected by the city council only if it is put in government issued rubbish bags. This policy has successfully reduced the amount of waste the city produces and increased the recycling rate.

Another example from a country that enforces a waste tax is Italy. Instead of using government issued bags like Taipei, the tax is based on two rates: fixed and variable. The fixed rate is based on the size of the house while the variable is determined by the amount of people living in the house.

The World Bank finances and advises on solid waste management projects using a diverse suite of products and services, including traditional loans, results-based financing, development policy financing, and technical advisory. World Bank-financed waste management projects usually address the entire lifecycle of waste right from the point of generation to collection and transportation, and finally treatment and disposal.

Disposal methods

Landfill

Incineration

Incineration is a disposal method in which solid organic wastes are subjected to combustion so as to convert them into residue and gaseous products. This method is useful for disposal of both municipal solid waste and solid residue from waste water treatment. This process reduces the volumes of solid waste by 80 to 95 percent. Incineration and other high temperature waste treatment systems are sometimes described as "thermal treatment". Incinerators convert waste materials into heat, gas, steam, and ash.

Incineration is carried out both on a small scale by individuals and on a large scale by industry. It is used to dispose of solid, liquid and gaseous waste. It is recognized as a practical method of disposing of certain hazardous waste materials (such as biological medical waste). Incineration is a controversial method of waste disposal, due to issues such as emission of gaseous pollutants including substantial quantities of carbon dioxide.

Incineration is common in countries such as Japan where land is more scarce, as the facilities generally do not require as much area as landfills. Waste-to-energy (WtE) or energy-from-waste (EfW) are broad terms for facilities that burn waste in a furnace or boiler to generate heat, steam or electricity. Combustion in an incinerator is not always perfect and there have been concerns about pollutants in gaseous emissions from incinerator stacks. Particular concern has focused on some very persistent organic compounds such as dioxins, furans, and PAHs, which may be created and which may have serious environmental consequences and some heavy metals such as mercury and lead which can be volatilised in the combustion process..

Recycling

Recycling is a resource recovery practice that refers to the collection and reuse of waste materials such as empty beverage containers. This process involves breaking down and reusing materials that would otherwise be gotten rid of as trash. There are numerous benefits of recycling, and with so many new technologies making even more materials recyclable, it is possible to clean up the Earth. Recycling not only benefits the environment but also positively affects the economy. The materials from which the items are made can be made into new products. Materials for recycling may be collected separately from general waste using dedicated bins and collection vehicles, a procedure called kerbside collection. In some communities, the owner of the waste is required to separate the materials into different bins (e.g. for paper, plastics, metals) prior to its collection. In other communities, all recyclable materials are placed in a single bin for collection, and the sorting is handled later at a central facility. The latter method is known as "single-stream recycling."

The most common consumer products recycled include aluminium such as beverage cans, copper such as wire, steel from food and aerosol cans, old steel furnishings or equipment, rubber tyres, polyethylene and PET bottles, glass bottles and jars, paperboard cartons, newspapers, magazines and light paper, and corrugated fiberboard boxes.

PVC, LDPE, PP, and PS (see resin identification code) are also recyclable. These items are usually composed of a single type of material, making them relatively easy to recycle into new products. The recycling of complex products (such as computers and electronic equipment) is more difficult, due to the additional dismantling and separation required.

The type of material accepted for recycling varies by city and country. Each city and country has different recycling programs in place that can handle the various types of recyclable materials. However, certain variation in acceptance is reflected in the resale value of the material once it is reprocessed. Some of the types of recycling include waste paper and cardboard, plastic recycling, metal recycling, electronic devices, wood recycling, glass recycling, cloth and textile and so many more. In July 2017, the Chinese government announced an import ban of 24 categories of recyclables and solid waste, including plastic, textiles and mixed paper, placing tremendous impact on developed countries globally, which exported directly or indirectly to China.

Re-use

Biological reprocessing

Recoverable materials that are organic in nature, such as plant material, food scraps, and paper products, can be recovered through composting and digestion processes to decompose the organic matter. The resulting organic material is then recycled as mulch or compost for agricultural or landscaping purposes. In addition, waste gas from the process (such as methane) can be captured and used for generating electricity and heat (CHP/cogeneration) maximising efficiencies. There are different types of composting and digestion methods and technologies. They vary in complexity from simple home compost heaps to large scale industrial digestion of mixed domestic waste. The different methods of biological decomposition are classified as aerobic or anaerobic methods. Some methods use the hybrids of these two methods. The anaerobic digestion of the organic fraction of solid waste is more environmentally effective than landfill, or incineration. The intention of biological processing in waste management is to control and accelerate the natural process of decomposition of organic matter. (See resource recovery).

Energy recovery

Energy recovery from waste is the conversion of non-recyclable waste materials into usable heat, electricity, or fuel through a variety of processes, including combustion, gasification, pyrolyzation, anaerobic digestion, and landfill gas recovery. This process is often called waste-to-energy. Energy recovery from waste is part of the non-hazardous waste management hierarchy. Using energy recovery to convert non-recyclable waste materials into electricity and heat, generates a renewable energy source and can reduce carbon emissions by offsetting the need for energy from fossil sources as well as reduce methane generation from landfills. Globally, waste-to-energy accounts for 16% of waste management.

The energy content of waste products can be harnessed directly by using them as a direct combustion fuel, or indirectly by processing them into another type of fuel. Thermal treatment ranges from using waste as a fuel source for cooking or heating and the use of the gas fuel (see above), to fuel for boilers to generate steam and electricity in a turbine. Pyrolysis and gasification are two related forms of thermal treatment where waste materials are heated to high temperatures with limited oxygen availability. The process usually occurs in a sealed vessel under high pressure. Pyrolysis of solid waste converts the material into solid, liquid and gas products. The liquid and gas can be burnt to produce energy or refined into other chemical products (chemical refinery). The solid residue (char) can be further refined into products such as activated carbon. Gasification and advanced Plasma arc gasification are used to convert organic materials directly into a synthetic gas (syngas) composed of carbon monoxide and hydrogen. The gas is then burnt to produce electricity and steam.
An alternative to pyrolysis is high temperature and pressure supercritical water decomposition (hydrothermal monophasic oxidation).

Pyrolysis

Pyrolysis is often used to convert many types of domestic and industrial residues into a recovered fuel. Different types of waste input (such as plant waste, food waste, tyres) placed in the pyrolysis process potentially yield an alternative to fossil fuels. Pyrolysis is a process of thermo-chemical decomposition of organic materials by heat in the absence of stoichiometric quantities of oxygen; the decomposition produces various hydrocarbon gases. During pyrolysis, the molecules of object vibrate at high frequencies to an extent that molecules start breaking down. The rate of pyrolysis increases with temperature. In industrial applications, temperatures are above 430 °C (800 °F).

Slow pyrolysis produces gases and solid charcoal. Pyrolysis hold promise for conversion of waste biomass into useful liquid fuel. Pyrolysis of waste wood and plastics can potentially produce fuel. The solids left from pyrolysis contain metals, glass, sand and pyrolysis coke which does not convert to gas. Compared to the process of incineration, certain types of pyrolysis processes release less harmful by-products that contain alkali metals, sulphur, and chlorine. However, pyrolysis of some waste yields gases which impact the environment such as HCl and SO2.

Resource recovery

Resource recovery is the systematic diversion of waste, which was intended for disposal, for a specific next use. It is the processing of recyclables to extract or recover materials and resources, or convert to energy. These activities are performed at a resource recovery facility. Resource recovery is not only environmentally important, but it is also cost-effective. It decreases the amount of waste for disposal, saves space in landfills, and conserves natural resources.

Resource recovery (as opposed to waste management) uses LCA (life cycle analysis) attempts to offer alternatives to waste management. For mixed MSW (Municipal Solid Waste) a number of broad studies have indicated that administration, source separation and collection followed by reuse and recycling of the non-organic fraction and energy and compost/fertilizer production of the organic material via anaerobic digestion to be the favoured path.

As an example of how resource recycling can be beneficial, many items thrown away contain metals that can be recycled to create a profit, such as the components in circuit boards. Wood chippings in pallets and other packaging materials can be recycled to useful products for horticulture. The recycled chips can cover paths, walkways, or arena surfaces.

Application of rational and consistent waste management practices can yield a range of benefits including:
 Economic – Improving economic efficiency through the means of resource use, treatment and disposal and creating markets for recycles can lead to efficient practices in the production and consumption of products and materials resulting in valuable materials being recovered for reuse and the potential for new jobs and new business opportunities.
 Social – By reducing adverse impacts on health by proper waste management practises, the resulting consequences are more appealing civic communities. Better social advantages can lead to new sources of employment and potentially lifting communities out of poverty especially in some of the developing poorer countries and cities.
 Environmental – Reducing or eliminating adverse impacts on the environment through reducing, reusing and recycling, and minimizing resource extraction can result in improved air and water quality and help in the reduction of greenhouse gas emissions.
 Inter-generational Equity – Following effective waste management practises can provide subsequent generations a more robust economy, a fairer and more inclusive society and a cleaner environment.

Waste valorization

Liquid waste-management
Liquid waste is an important category of waste management because it is so difficult to deal with. Unlike solid wastes, liquid wastes cannot be easily picked up and removed from an environment. Liquid wastes spread out, and easily pollute other sources of liquid if brought into contact. This type of waste also soaks into objects like soil and groundwater. This in turn carries over to pollute the plants, the animals in the ecosystem, as well as the humans within the area of the pollution.

Industrial wastewater

Sewage sludge treatment

Avoidance and reduction methods

An important method of waste management is the prevention of waste material being created, also known as waste reduction. Waste Minimization is reducing the quantity of hazardous wastes achieved through a thorough application of innovative or alternative procedures. Methods of avoidance include reuse of second-hand products, repairing broken items instead of buying new ones, designing products to be refillable or reusable (such as cotton instead of plastic shopping bags), encouraging consumers to avoid using disposable products (such as disposable cutlery), removing any food/liquid remains from cans and packaging, and designing products that use less material to achieve the same purpose (for example, lightweighting of beverage cans).

International waste trade

Challenges in developing countries
Areas with developing economies often experience exhausted waste collection services and inadequately managed and uncontrolled dumpsites. The problems are worsening. Problems with governance complicate the situation. Waste management in these countries and cities is an ongoing challenge due to weak institutions, chronic under-resourcing and rapid urbanization. All of these challenges, along with the lack of understanding of different factors that contribute to the hierarchy of waste management, affect the treatment of waste.

In developing countries, waste management activities are usually carried by poor, for their survival. It has been estimated that 2% of population in Asia, Latin America and Africa are dependent on waste for their livelihood. Family organized, or individual manual scavengers are often involved with waste management practices with very little supportive network and facilities with increased risk of health effects. Additionally, this practice prevents their children from further education. Participation level of most citizens in waste management is very low, residents in urban areas are not actively involved in the process of waste management.

Technologies

Traditionally, the waste management industry has been a late adopter of new technologies such as RFID (Radio Frequency Identification) tags, GPS and integrated software packages which enable better quality data to be collected without the use of estimation or manual data entry. This technology has been used widely by many organizations in some industrialized countries. Radio frequency identification is a tagging system for automatic identification of recyclable components of municipal solid waste stream.

Waste management by region

China
Municipal solid waste generation shows spatiotemporal variation. In spatial distribution, the point sources in eastern coastal regions are quite different. Guangdong, Shanghai and Tianjin produced MSW of 30.35, 7.85 and 2.95 Mt, respectively. In temporal distribution, during 2009–2018, Fujian province showed 123% increase in MSW generation while Liaoning province showed only 7% increase, whereas Shanghai special zone had a decline of −11% after 2013. MSW composition characteristics is complicated. The major components such as kitchen waste, paper and rubber & plastics in different eastern coastal cities have fluctuation in the range of 52.8–65.3%, 3.5–11.9%, and 9.9–19.1%, respectively. Treatment rate of consumption waste is up to 99% with a sum of 52% landfill, 45% incineration, and 3% composting technologies, indicating that landfill still dominates MSW treatment.

Morocco
Morocco has seen benefits from implementing a $300 million sanitary landfill system. While it might appear to be a costly investment, the country's government predicts that it has saved them another $440 million in damages, or consequences of failing to dispose of waste properly.

San Francisco
San Francisco started to make changes to their waste management policies in 2009 with the expectation to be zero waste by 2030. Council made changes such as making recycling and composting a mandatory practice for businesses and individuals, banning Styrofoam and plastic bags, putting charges on paper bags, and increasing garbage collection rates. Businesses are fiscally rewarded for correct disposal of recycling and composting and taxed for incorrect disposal. Besides these policies, the waste bins were manufactured in various sizes. The compost bin is the largest, the recycling bin is second, and the garbage bin is the smallest. This encourages individuals to sort their waste thoughtfully in respect to the sizes. These systems are working because they were able to divert 80% of waste from the landfill, which is the highest rate of any major U.S. city. Despite all these changes, Debbie Raphael, director of the San Francisco Department of the Environment, states that zero waste is still not achievable until all products are designed differently to be able to be recycled or compostable.

Turkey

United Kingdom

Waste management policy in England is a responsibility of the Department of the Environment, Food and Rural Affairs (DEFRA). In England, the "Waste management plan for England" presents a compilation of waste management policies. In the devolved nations such as Scotland Waste management policy is a responsibility of their own respective departments.

Zambia
In Zambia, ASAZA is a community-based organization whose principal purpose is to complement the efforts of Government and co-operating partners to uplift the standard of living for disadvantaged communities. The project's main objective is to minimize the problem of indiscriminate littering which leads to land degradation and pollution of the environment. ASAZA is also at the same time helping alleviate the problems of unemployment and poverty through income generation and payment of participants, women and unskilled youths.

E-waste
A record 53.6 million metric tonnes (Mt) of electronic waste was generated worldwide in 2019, up 21 per cent in just five years, according to the UN’s Global E-waste Monitor 2020, released today. The new report also predicts global e-waste – discarded products with a battery or plug – will reach 74 Mt by 2030, almost a doubling of e-waste in just 16 years. This makes e-waste the world’s fastest-growing domestic waste stream, fueled mainly by higher consumption rates of electric and electronic equipment, short life cycles, and few options for repair. Only 17.4 per cent of 2019’s e-waste was collected and recycled. This means that gold, silver, copper, platinum and other high-value, recoverable materials conservatively valued at US$57 billion – a sum greater than the Gross Domestic Product of most countries – were mostly dumped or burned rather than being collected for treatment and reuse.

Transboundary movement of e-waste
The Transboundary E-waste Flows Monitor quantified that 5.1 Mt (just below 10 percent of the total amount of global e-waste, 53.6 Mt) crossed country borders in 2019. To better understand the implication of transboundary movement, this study categorizes the transboundary movement of e-waste into controlled and uncontrolled movements and also considers both the receiving and sending regions.

Global E-Waste Data
https://globalewaste.org/map/
Future: E-waste will double by 2050.

Method
1. Arrange to take your e-waste to a recycling firm like Great Lakes Electronics Corporation. The benefits of doing so are enormous.
2. Recycling remains the most effective way to keep e-waste from damaging our environment and our health. 
3. The best thing you can do is to resist buying a new device until you really need it. Try to get your old product repaired if possible and if it can't be fixed, resell or recycle it responsibly.
4. Before you recycle your device, seal up any broken parts in separate containers so that hazardous chemicals don't leak. Wear latex gloves and a mask if you're handling something that's broken.

Scientific journals

Related scientific journals in this area include:
 Environmental and Resource Economics
 Environmental Monitoring and Assessment
 Journal of Environmental Assessment Policy and Management
 Journal of Environmental Economics and Management

See also

References

External links

 
Management by type